The South Harz Railway Company or SHE was founded in 1897 and, on 15 August 1899, opened a 24 km long, winding and hilly, metre gauge railway from Walkenried via Wieda and Brunnenbachsmühle to Braunlage in the Harz Mountains of central Germany. On 1 November 1899 a 3 km extension for goods trains was opened to the Wurmberg mountain.

From 24 August 1899 an 8 km line branched off in Brunnenbachsmühle that ran through Sorge to Tanne. It provided a link with the Harz Railway operated by the Nordhausen-Wernigerode Railway Company and the Harz line run by the Halberstadt-Blankenburg Railway. This branch was cut in 1945 by the border zone and services were interrupted.

The "main branch" was worked by passenger trains and railbuses until 30 September 1962. Goods trains stopped running on 3 August 1963; the Wurmberg line had not been worked since 1958. Its operator was the Hermann Bachstein Central Office for Branch Lines (Centralverwaltung für Secundairbahnen Herrmann Bachstein), which had purchased the majority of shares in the South Harz Railway Company shortly after its foundation and which was turned into a public limited company (GmbH) in 1965.

Sources 
 Manfred Bornemann: Die Südharz-Eisenbahn. Verlag Ed. Piepersche Druckerei, Clausthal-Zellerfeld 1981
 Gerhard Zieglgänsberger, Hans Röper: Die Harzer Schmalspurbahnen. Transpress Verlag, Stuttgart 1999, 
 Wínfried Dörner: Die Südharz-Eisenbahn – eine Region und ihre Eisenbahn. Papierflieger Druck und Verlag, Clausthal-Zellerfeld 2007,

External links 
 
 Information about the South Harz Railway Company and the present-day cycleway
 1944 timetable
 Info at Harzlife – the online travel guide
 Locomotives of the SHE

Defunct railway companies of Germany
Railway lines in Lower Saxony
Railway lines in Saxony-Anhalt
Transport in the Harz
Goslar (district)
Metre gauge railways in Germany
Cycleways in Germany